The 1945 Appalachian State Mountaineers football team was an American football team that represented Appalachian State Teachers College (now known as Appalachian State University) as a member of the North State Conference during the 1945 college football season. In their only year under head coach Francis Hoover, the Mountaineers compiled an overall record of 1–6, with a mark of 1–3 in conference play, and finished 3rd in the NSC.

Schedule

References

Appalachian State
Appalachian State Mountaineers football seasons
Appalachian State Mountaineers football